The Jewish Cemetery Aachen is located in Aachen in North Rhine-Westphalia. It is on the corner of Lütticher Straße (English "Liège street") and Körnerstraße.

The Jewish cemetery was transferred to the Jewish community of Aachen in June 1822 and used for burials from the same year. In 1865 and 1878, the site was expanded. The burial hall was completed in 1890. The oldest tombstone dates from 1822. In the cemetery, which is still in use today, there are 1366 tombstones for 2153 deceased (as of December 2014).

The cemetery has been desecrated several times. Most recently, on the night of 1–2 August 2010, the cemetery wall was vandalized with anti-semitic smearings and Nazi symbolism.

See also
  (another Jewish cemetery in Aachen)

References

Further reading
  (2+xvi+650 pages+10 folded sheets of maps+2 pages)
 (59 pages)
  (2+514+2+2 pages, 1 insert of a folded map sheet)

External links

 Jüdischer Friedhof Lütticher Straße Aachen beim 
 Virtual tour around the Jewish Cemetery Aachen
 Familienbuch Euregio

1820s architecture
Jewish cemeteries in North-Rhine Westphalia
Jews and Judaism in Germany